North Africa has contributed considerably to popular music, especially Egyptian classical music alongside el Gil, Algerian raï and Chaabi (internationally-known tubes such as "Ya Rayah"-Dahman El Harrachi or Aicha-Cheb Khaled). The broad region is sometimes called Maghreb (excluding Egypt), and the term Maghrebian music is in use. For a variety of reasons Libya does not have as extensive nor popular a tradition as its neighbours. Folk music abounds, however, despite frequent condemnation and suppression from governments, existing in multiple forms across the region—the Berbers, Sephardic Jews, Tuaregs, Copts and Nubians, for example, retain musical traditions with their ancient roots. 

Andalusian music is especially influential, and is played in widely varying forms across the region. This music was imported from Andalusia in the 15th century, after Spain expelled the Moors from that province. The Spanish conquest of the historically Muslim Iberian Peninsula had been going on for some time, and resulted in the emigration of many Iberian Muslims, who were themselves descended from people from across the Mediterranean, into North Africa. These people brought with them a vibrant tradition that had arisen as a fusion of various kinds of Muslim music from Baghdad, Istanbul, Egypt and elsewhere. The best-known derivatives of this style are al-âla in Morocco, Nuubaat and other related styles in Algeria and Ma'luf in Tunisia.

Traditions

Algeria

Of all the North African countries, Algeria's popular music may be the best-known abroad. Raï, a style of urban popular music developed in early 20th century Oran, has become a common sound in parts of Europe, especially France (which has a large Algerian population) since the late 1980s. The music of the Berber Kabyle people and Chaabi are both also renowned throughout the country, and in France.

Developed from musical styles which were themselves borrowed from Andalusia in the 15th century, Algerian Nuubaat is a kind of classical music that remains popular in much of the country. Over the years, it has evolved into related styles like the rabaab and hawzii.

Egypt

Egypt's best-known popular tradition is the classical Egyptian music of stars like Abdel Halim Hafez. Other prominent modern styles include Shaabi, el Gil, and Egyptian pop.

Libya

Libyan music, like the music of other North African countries, consists of both local and foreign elements. The factors important to the development of music in Libya are: indigenous North African music, Arabic music theory, language and culture, and Ottoman Turkish music. Because of these factors, Libya's musical heritage can be further divided into four types:
1. Ceremonial music that is associated with the culture and customs of the Sufi-Turugs.
2. Classical vocal music that belongs to the traditional Arab music of Al-Andalus (Muslim Spain, 730-1494 Ad.), and includes Al-muash'shahat and Al-maluf.
3. Classical instrumental music, which evolved from the Arab art-music heritage and was inspired by Turkish elements.
4. Libyan folk music, which also features Central African and Arab musical influences styles.

Tunisia

Tunisia is best known as the centre for ma'luf, a derivative of the Andalusian music imported to North Africa in the 15th century. Since the 1930s, a number of organisations (as well as the first President of Tunisia, Habib Bourguiba) have been promoting ma'luf as an integral aspect of Tunisian culture, helping to keep the ancient tradition alive.

Since the 2000s, modern styles have penetrated the market and been adapted to Tunisian culture, such as reggae or hip hop. Many artists like Weld El 15 received public notoriety from the Tunisian revolution for criticising the ancient regime in its abuse of power during the country's democratisation process.

References